Fritz Stiedry (11 October 18838 August 1968) was an Austrian conductor and composer.

Biography
Fritz Stiedry was born in Vienna in 1883. While still a law student at the University of Vienna, Stiedry's talent for music was noticed by Gustav Mahler, who appointed him his assistant at the Vienna Court Opera in 1907. This was followed by other assistant posts, leading to chief conductorships at the operas of Kassel and Berlin.  In 1932 he conducted the world premiere of Kurt Weill's opera Die Bürgschaft.

Stiedry left Germany when Adolf Hitler came to power in 1933, and from 1934 to 1937 was principal conductor of the Leningrad Philharmonic Orchestra. He was involved in rehearsals for the premiere of Shostakovich's Fourth Symphony until the premiere was canceled for reasons, in all probability political, that remain controversial.  Some claim that Shostakovich felt Stiedry was unable to deal with the symphony's complexities, but others maintain that the real reason was that Communist Party officials pressured the composer to withdraw the work.

In 1937, Stiedry left Leningrad for the United States and the New Friends of Music Orchestra in New York, conducting long-neglected works by Bach, Haydn and Mozart and premiering Schoenberg's Second Chamber Symphony. From 1945 onwards he returned to opera, conducting the Lyric Opera of Chicago and the Metropolitan Opera of New York and co-founding the Hunter College Opera Workshop.

He died in Zürich, Switzerland in 1968, aged 84.

He recorded Haydn's symphonies nos. 67, 80, 99 and 102.  His live recording from the Metropolitan Opera of Giuseppe Verdi's La forza del destino (omitting the Act I inn scene, as customary there in the 1950s under Rudolf Bing) has been transferred to CD.

Works
 Der gerettete Alkibiades, opera
 chamber music

Literature
 Holmes, John L. Conductors on record, Victor Gollancz, 1982.
 Handbuch österreichischer Autorinnen und Autoren jüdischer Herkunft 18. bis 20. Jahrhundert. Vol. 3, S-Z. Ed. Österreichische Nationalbibliothek Wien. K. G. Saur, 2002, p. 1328.
 Sadie, Stanley. The new Grove Dictionary of Music and Musicians, Macmillan, 1980.
 Lyman, Darryl. Great Jews in Music, J. D. Publishers, 1986.
 Sadie, Stanley; Hitchcock, H. Wiley (Ed.). The New Grove Dictionary of American Music. Grove's Dictionaries of Music, 1986.
 Myers, Kurtz. Index to record reviews 1984–1987, G.K. Hall, 1989.
 Pâris, Alain. Dictionnaire des interpretes et de l'interpretation musicale au XX siecle, Robert Laffont, 1989.

External links
[ Article at allmusic.com]
 Biography

References

1883 births
1968 deaths
20th-century classical composers
Austrian classical composers
Austrian male classical composers
Male conductors (music)
German expatriates in the Soviet Union
Austrian emigrants to Germany
Austrian Jews
Austrian refugees
Jewish classical musicians
Jewish musicians
Neoromantic composers
Austrian opera composers
Male opera composers
Musicians from Vienna
Jewish emigrants from Nazi Germany to the United States
University of Vienna alumni
20th-century Austrian conductors (music)
20th-century Austrian male musicians
Refugees from Nazi Germany in the Soviet Union